The 2005–06 Liga Gimel season saw 84 clubs competing in 7 regional divisions for promotion to Liga Bet.

Upper Galilee Division

 Hapoel Ironi Hatzor withdrew midway during the season and its results were annulled.

Western Galilee Division

 Beitar al-Amal Nazareth and Maccabi Maghar withdrew midway during the season and their results were annulled.

Jezreel Division

Samaria Division

Sharon Division

Tel Aviv Division

Central-South Division

 Ironi Lod withdrew midway during the season and its results were annulled.

External links
Liga Gimel Upper Galilee The Israel Football Association 
Liga Gimel Western Galilee The Israel Football Association 
Liga Gimel Jezreel The Israel Football Association 
Liga Gimel Samaria The Israel Football Association 
Liga Gimel Sharon The Israel Football Association 
Liga Gimel Tel Aviv The Israel Football Association 
Liga Gimel Central-South The Israel Football Association 

6
Liga Gimel seasons